Sasnières is a commune in the Loir-et-Cher department in central France.

Population

Politics
During the 2008 election, Guillaume Henrion became the new mayor of Sasnières. In 2014, Claire Granger was elected the mayor of Sasnières.

See also
Communes of the Loir-et-Cher department

References

Communes of Loir-et-Cher